Kevin Michael White (born September 25, 1950) is an American college administrator who is the former athletic director at Duke University. He held this position from May 30, 2008 until his retirement on September 1, 2021. White succeeded Joe Alleva as the Blue Devils' AD when Alleva accepted the same position at Louisiana State University.

He held similar positions at the University of Notre Dame, Arizona State University, Tulane University, the University of Maine, and Loras College.

Early life and education
White was born in Amityville, New York. Earning a bachelor's degree in business administration in 1972 from St. Joseph's College in Rensselaer, Indiana, White went on to earn a master's degree in athletics administration from Central Michigan University in 1976.  He completed his Ph.D. in 1983 at Southern Illinois University with an emphasis in higher education administration.  He has done postdoctoral work at Harvard University in the Institute for Educational Management.

Teaching and coaching careers

High school
White is a career educator, having started as a high school teacher at Gulf High School, in New Port Richey, Florida. While at Gulf High, he coached cross country and track and assisted with the football and wrestling programs.

College
Holding a Ph.D. in education, White taught management courses at Notre Dame's Mendoza College of Business in the MBA program during spring semesters of his tenure at the school.

As a coach, White served at Southeast Missouri State University (1981–1982) as the head track and field coach, and as assistant track and field and cross country coach at Central Michigan University (1976–1980). While at Loras College he originated the National Catholic Basketball Tournament.

Administrative career and controversies

Notre Dame's flagship football program struggled during White's tenure.  Notre Dame football teams have started 0–3 only two times in the school's history: in 2001 (the season after White negotiated an extension of coach Bob Davie's contract) and 2007 (two seasons after White gave coach Charlie Weis a 10-year contract extension, which Notre Dame was paying off six seasons after Weis's 2009 firing).

White is also responsible for the hiring of George O'Leary (who was fired a week later after falsifying his resume) and Tyrone Willingham (who started 8–0 but finished 13–15, with eight of those losses coming by 22 points or more, more than any coach in school history).  White is also responsible for the hiring and retaining of Duke women's basketball coach Joanne P. McCallie (even after McCallie was investigated by Duke for the mistreatment of players and assistant coaches).

Family
White and his wife Jane have five children, three sons and two daughters. Four of their children work in college athletics: Mike, head coach of the Georgia Bulldogs men's basketball team; Danny, newly hired in January 2021 as athletic director of the Tennessee Volunteers; Brian, athletic director for the Florida Atlantic Owls; and Mariah Chappell, assistant athletic director for the SMU Mustangs. Their eldest child, Maureen Treadway, is a high school English teacher in Arizona.

Hall of fame inductee

White was inducted into the Suffolk Sports Hall of Fame on Long Island in the Athletic Directors Category with the Class of 2006.

References

External links
 Duke profile

1950 births
Living people
American track and field coaches
Arizona State Sun Devils athletic directors
Arizona State University faculty
Duke Blue Devils athletic directors
Maine Black Bears athletic directors
Notre Dame Fighting Irish athletic directors
Tulane Green Wave athletic directors
College track and field coaches in the United States
High school football coaches in Florida
High school wrestling coaches in the United States
Central Michigan University alumni
Harvard Graduate School of Education alumni
Southern Illinois University alumni
People from Amityville, New York
Sportspeople from Suffolk County, New York